Peter Victor Smith (born 22 September 1947 in Brunswick, Victoria) is a former Australian rules footballer who played with Melbourne and Carlton in the Victorian Football League (VFL).

Smith was recruited from Melbourne Grammar and came to the Melbourne Football Club with the pressure of being the son of club great Norm Smith. A forward, he played eight games in the 1966 VFL season and 15 in 1967. He left the club after two seasons to join Carlton, coached by his friend Ron Barassi. He spent most of his time at Carlton as captain of the reserves team and managed just 15 senior games before being granted a clearance to Port Melbourne.

After spending three years at Port Melbourne, during which time his father died, Smith crossed to Coburg in a straight swap for Mick Erwin. He topped the Victorian Football Association Division Two goal-kicking in 1974 with 121 goals and his bag of 13 goals against Mordialloc late in the year saw him join Bob Pratt, Lance Collins and Jack Titus as the only Coburg players to boot a century in a season. Smith was also the full-forward in the 1974 Coburg premiership side and topped the club's goal-kicking once more in 1975.

References

1947 births
Melbourne Football Club players
Carlton Football Club players
Port Melbourne Football Club players
Coburg Football Club players
Living people
People educated at Melbourne Grammar School
Australian rules footballers from Melbourne
People from Brunswick, Victoria